Chhatriwali is a 2023 Indian Hindi-language social comedy film directed by Tejas Prabha Vijay Deoskar and produced by Ronnie Screwvala. The film stars an Rakul Preet Singh, Sumeet Vyas, Satish Kaushik, Dolly Ahluwalia and Rajesh Tailang. The film was premiered on 20 January 2023 on ZEE5. 
The film aims to promote the importance of male contraceptives and safe sex. It marked the last film of Kaushik before his death on 9 March 2023.

Plot 
Set in Karnal, the film is about Sanya Dhingra, a female unemployed chemistry genius, who is, looking for a job and at the same time she uses her skills to fight an important societal taboo of educating the youth about Sex Education.

Cast 
 Rakul Preet Singh as Sanya Dhingra
 Sumeet Vyas as Rishi Kalra
 Satish Kaushik as Ratan Lamba
 Dolly Ahluwalia as Dhingra Aunty
 Rajesh Tailang as Rajan Kalra / Bhai Ji
 Prachee Shah Paandya as Nisha Kalra
 Rakesh Bedi as Madan Chacha
 Riva Arora as Mini Kalra
 Punit Tiwari
 Awlad Hossen Eshan

Production 
The shoot of the film started soon in November 2021. It was mostly shot in Lucknow, Uttar Pradesh. The shoots were wrapped by December 2021.

Soundtrack 

The music for the film composed by Akhil Sachdeva, Rohan-Rohan, Sumeet Bellary and Durgesh R Rajbhatt. Lyrics are written by Tejas Prabha, Vijay Deoskar, Akhil Sachdeva, Satya Khare and Saaveri Verma.

References

External links 
 

Indian romantic comedy films
2020s Hindi-language films